Sunneva Jaarlintytär (Finnish: Sunneva, Daughter of the Jarl) is a historical novel by Finnish author Kaari Utrio.

Novels by Kaari Utrio
1969 novels
Tammi (company) books
20th-century Finnish novels
Finnish historical novels